Vriesea rodigasiana is a plant species in the genus Vriesea. This species is endemic to Brazil.

References

BSI Cultivar Registry Retrieved 11 October 2009

rodigasiana
Flora of Brazil